Sarcographa is a genus of lichenized fungi in the family Graphidaceae. It is estimated to contain 37 species. The genus was circumscribed by French botanist Antoine Laurent Apollinaire Fée in 1825.

References

Graphidaceae
Lichen genera
Ostropales genera
Taxa named by Antoine Laurent Apollinaire Fée
Taxa described in 1825